Yuliya Romanivna Kazarinova (born 2 January 1992) is a Ukrainian badminton player.

Achievements

BWF International Challenge/Series (2 titles, 4 runners-up) 
Women's doubles

Mixed doubles

  BWF International Challenge tournament
  BWF International Series tournament
  BWF Future Series tournament

References

External links 
 

Living people
1992 births
Sportspeople from Mykolaiv
Ukrainian female badminton players
European Games competitors for Ukraine
Badminton players at the 2015 European Games
21st-century Ukrainian women